Ana Radović (born 15 July 1990 in Užice, SFR Yugoslavia) is Serbian female basketball player.

External links
 
 
 

1990 births
Living people
Centers (basketball)
Sportspeople from Užice
Serbian women's basketball players
Serbian women's 3x3 basketball players
ŽKK Vojvodina players
ŽKK Crvena zvezda players
ŽKK Voždovac players
Mediterranean Games silver medalists for Serbia
Competitors at the 2009 Mediterranean Games
Mediterranean Games medalists in basketball